Ahamed Jamaldeen Mohamed Muzammil is a Sri Lankan politician, the Mayor of Colombo between 2011 and 2016, he also served as Sri Lankan High Commissioner to Malaysia (2017-2019), following which he was appointed the ninth Governor of the Western Province in 2019, the eleventh Governor of the North Western Province, and on 31 August 2020, appointed the thirteenth Governor of the Uva Province.

Early life
Muzammil was born on 5 January 1949 and hails from Kahawatta, Ratnapura District. He was educated at Zahira College, Colombo. He is a long-standing member of Moors Sports Club, having played for it briefly, and its current president. He was also vice president of Sri Lanka Cricket.

Political career
Muzammil joined the United National Party in 1970 as a student. Muzammil later joined the Sri Lanka Muslim Congress.

Muzammil and other SLMC members left the party in 2004 and formed the Democratic Unity Alliance. He was the DUA's national organiser. Muzammil was a DUA candidate in Colombo District at the 2004 Western provincial council election. He was elected and entered Western Provincial Council. He was the sole DUA provincial councillor in the country.

Muzammil rejoined the UNP in 2009. He was a UNP candidate in Colombo District at the 2009 Western provincial council election. He was re-elected. He was a UNP candidate in Colombo District at the 2010 parliamentary election but failed to get elected after coming ninth amongst the UNP candidates. In August 2011 Muzammil was chosen to be the UNP's mayoral candidate in Colombo. He subsequently resigned from the Western Provincial Council to contest the local elections.

He was appointed the Sri Lankan High Commissioner to Malaysia on 1 February 2017.

See also 
List of Sri Lankan non-career diplomats

References

External links
 muzammil.org

1949 births
Alumni of Zahira College, Colombo
Living people
Mayors of Colombo
Members of the Western Provincial Council
People from Colombo
People from Sabaragamuwa Province
Sri Lanka Muslim Congress politicians
Sri Lankan Moor politicians
Sri Lankan Muslims
United National Party politicians
Sri Lankan justices of the peace
High Commissioners of Sri Lanka to Malaysia